The Storylines Notable Book Awards constitute an annual list of exceptional and outstanding books for children and young people published in New Zealand, by New Zealand authors and illustrators, during the previous calendar year.

History 
The Storylines Notable Book Awards began in 1999 and have been announced each year since then.

The list is announced each year in March and the awards are made at the Storylines Margaret Mahy Awards Day together with the Margaret Mahy Medal and Lecture, and the announcement of the winners of the Storylines Tessa Duder Award, Tom Fitzgibbon Award, Joy Cowley Award and the Gaelyn Gordon Award for a Much-Loved Book. This event is held in Auckland on the weekend closest to 2 April, International Children’s Book Day (and the birthday of Hans Christian Andersen).

Eligibility and conditions 

 The books named as Storylines Notable Books are chosen by a panel of experts (appointed by Storylines) who may include writers, illustrators, teachers, librarians and academics.
 Criteria includes literary merit, book design and editing, plot, characterisation, dialogue and general appeal and appropriateness for the intended audience. 
 Books are listed in several categories: Picture Book, Junior Fiction, Young Adult and Non Fiction. For the 2019 Awards, there is a judging panel for the first time for books published in te reo Māori. and Te Reo Māori. 
 Up to ten awards are given in each category, although one or two more may be added if the standard is very high.
Anthologies can be included, as can titles by New Zealand writers and illustrators which have been published internationally.
 Some books which do not make the Notable Books List are given a Special Mention because of their contribution to their particular genre.

Winners 
There are always multiple awards handed out and these are split mostly by age. The specifics of each category have changed since it started but overall each can summarised as follows:

Picture Books Books for children and/or young adults where the narrative is carried equally by pictures and story (age range from birth to 18 years).

Junior Fiction Fiction suitable for primary and intermediate-aged children (age range from 7 years to 13 years).

Young Adult Fiction Fiction suitable for upper intermediate and secondary school students (age range from 13 years to 18 years).

Non-fiction For authoritative, well-designed information books accessible to children and young adults (age range from 3 years to 18 years).

Notable Te Reo Māori original texts or translations into Te Reo Maori, any genre.

See also 

List of New Zealand literary awards

External links 

Storylines Notable Book Awards - with a list of prize winners

References

New Zealand children's literary awards